Bapta is a village in Bhola Sadar Upazila of Bhola District in the Barisal Division of southern-central Bangladesh. About four-fifths of the village is in Bapta Union, with the remainder being part of Bhola Municipality.

References

Populated places in Bhola District